The 2010 census estimated Alabama's population at 4,802,740, an increase of 332,636 or 7.5% since 2000.  This includes a natural increase of 87,818 (375,808 births minus 287,990 deaths) and a net migration of 73,178 people into the state.  Immigration from outside the United States resulted in a net increase of 30,537 and migration within the country produced a net increase of 42,641.

As of 2000, 96.7% of Alabama residents age 5 and older speak English at home and 2.2% speak Spanish. German speakers make up only 0.4% of the population, French/French Creole at 0.3%, and Chinese at 0.1%.

In 2006 Alabama had a larger percentage of tobacco smokers than the national average, with 23% of adults smoking.

The religious affiliations of adult people in Alabama are as follows: Christian – 86%, Non-Christian Faiths – 1%, Other faiths – 1%, Unaffiliated (religious "nones") – 12%

As of 2000, 25.3% of residents of the state were under 18, 6.7% were under 5, and 13.0% were over 65.

51.7% of Alabamians are female and 48.3% are male; there is a surplus of 600,000 women in the age range of 25–44.

Population

The 2010 census estimated Alabama's population at 4,802,740, an increase of 332,636 or 7.5% since 2000.  This includes a natural increase of 87,818 (375,808 births minus 287,990 deaths) and a net migration of 73,178 people into the state.  Immigration from outside the United States resulted in a net increase of 30,537 and migration within the country produced a net increase of 42,641.

In 2006 Alabama had a larger percentage of tobacco smokers than the national average, with 23% of adults smoking.

The racial makeup of the state and comparison to the prior census:

2020 census

Birth data
Note: Births in table don't add up, because Hispanics are counted both by their ethnicity and by their race, giving a higher overall number.

Since 2016, data for births of White Hispanic origin are not collected, but included in one Hispanic group; persons of Hispanic origin may be of any race.

Ancestry

Historically, African Americans were brought to Alabama as slaves, in greatest numbers in the cotton-producing plantation region known as the Black Belt. This region remains predominantly African American, where many freedmen settled to work at agriculture after the Civil War. The northern part of the state, originally settled by small farmers with fewer slaves, is predominantly European American. The Port of Mobile, founded by the French and subsequently controlled by England, Spain, and the United States, has long had an ethnically diverse population. It has long served as an entry point for various groups settling in other parts of the state. Those citing "American" ancestry in Alabama are of overwhelmingly English extraction, however most English Americans identify simply as having American ancestry because their roots have been in North America for so long, in many cases since the early sixteen hundreds.  Demographers estimate that a minimum of 20–23% of people in Alabama are of predominantly English ancestry and state that the figure is probably much higher. In the 1980 census 1,139,976 people in Alabama cited that they were of English ancestry out of a total state population of 2,824,719 making them 41% of the state at the time and the largest ethnic group.  There are also many more people in Alabama of Scots-Irish origins than are self-reported. Many people in Alabama claim Irish ancestry because of the term "Scots-Irish", but most of the time in Alabama this term is used for those with Scottish roots, rather than Irish. Alabama is home to the Cherokee, Chickasaw, Choctaw, and Creek Native American tribes. Alabama has a growing Hispanic population. Mexicans are the largest Latino ethnic group in Alabama. Alabama is also home to Guatemalans, Puerto Ricans, Colombians, Brazilians, Salvadorians, and Panamanians.

Rankings
Among the 50 states and the District of Columbia, Alabama ranks:
32nd in its percentage of  European Americans
7th in its percentage of Blacks
43rd in its percentage of Hispanics
44th in its percentage of Asians
26th in its percentage of Native Americans
48th in its percentage of people of Mixed race
47th in its percentage of males
5th in its percentage of females

Religion
The religious affiliations of adult people in Alabama are as follows:
Christian – 86%
Evangelical Protestant – 49%
Baptist – 31%
Pentecostal – 5%
Presbyterian – 2%
Restorationist – 3%
Holiness movement – 1%
Mainline Protestant – 13%
Baptist – 2%
Methodist – 5%
Lutheran – 1%
Presbyterian – 1%
Episcopalian/ – 1%
Congregationalist – 1%
Historically Black Protestant – 16%
Baptist – 11%
Methodist – 3%
Pentecostal – 1%
Holiness Family – 1%
Catholic – 7%
LDS – 1%
Christian – non-denominational – 6%
Non-Christian Faiths – 1%
Other faiths – 1%
Unaffiliated (religious "nones") – 12%
Atheist – 1%
Agnostic – 1%
Nothing in Particular – 9%
Don't Know – 1%

See also
Demographics of the United States
Alabama locations by per capita income

References

Notes on references

External links
 2000 Census of Population and Housing for Alabama, U.S. Census Bureau

 
Economy of Alabama
Alabama